Zlatko Krasni ((born 1951, Sarajevo, Yugoslavia—died 31 October 2008) was a Serbian poet of Czech origin who resided in Belgrade for most of his life. He held a BA and an MA in Germanic Languages from the Philology College of the University of Belgrade.

Works
Krasni has won the prize of the Serbian Academy of Sciences and Arts and was a guest at the Literarisches Colloquium Berlin in 2005. One of Krasni's poems is quoted by defenders of the former Serbian dictator Slobodan Milosevic's admirers in Serbia.

References

1951 births
2008 deaths
Writers from Belgrade
Serbian male poets
Serbian people of Czech descent
German–Serbian translators
20th-century Serbian poets
20th-century translators